Butaxamine (INN, also known as butoxamine) is a β2-selective beta blocker. Its primary use is in experimental situations in which blockade of β2 receptors is necessary to determine the activity of the drug (i.e. if the β2 receptor is completely blocked, but the given effect is still present, the given effect is not a characteristic of the β2 receptor). It has no clinical use. An alternative name is α-(1-[tert-butylamino]ethyl)-2,5-dimethoxybenzyl alcohol.

See also
 Bupropion
 Methoxamine

References

Beta blockers
Phenylethanolamines
Tert-butyl compounds